BeeBase is an online bioinformatics database that displays data related to Apis mellifera, the European honey bee along with some pathogens and other species.  It was developed in collaboration with the Honey Bee Genome Sequencing Consortium. In 2020 it was archived and replaced by the Hymenoptera Genome Database.

Data
The site hosts the genome sequence for apis mellifera along with those of the following pathogens:
 Bombus terrestris
 Bombus impatiens

Two additional species are under analysis:
 Apis dorsata
 Apis florea

In Feb 2007, BeeBase consisted of a GBrowser-based genome viewer and a CMap-based] comparative map viewer, both modules of the Generic Model Organism Database (GMOD) project. The genome viewer included tracks for known honey bee genes, predicted gene sets (Ensembl, NCBI, EMBL-Heidelberg), STS markers (Solignac and Hunt linkage maps), honey bee expressed sequence tags (ESTs), homologs in fruit fly, mosquito and other insects and transposable elements. The honey bee comparative map viewer displayed linkage maps and the physical map (genome assembly), highlighting markers that are common among maps.

Future enhancements planned for BeeBase are a QTL viewer and a gene expression database. The genome sequence will serve as a reference to link these diverse data types.

Biological data and services available on BeeBase include:
 DNA and protein sequence data
 official bee gene set (developed by and hosted at Beebase)
 genome browser
 linkage maps
 server to search the honey bee genome using BLAST

Beebase organized the community annotation of the bee genome in collaboration with Baylor College of Medicine Human Genome Sequencing Center.

References

External links
 BeeBase

See also
 Wormbase
 Flybase
 Xenbase

Model organism databases
Genome projects
Beekeeping